Hooke may refer to:

 Hooke, Dorset, England
 River Hooke, nearby watercourse
 Robert Hooke (1635–1703), English natural philosopher who discovered Hooke's law
 Hooke (surname), a surname
 Hooke (lunar crater)
 Hooke (Martian crater)
 3514 Hooke, asteroid

See also
 Hook (disambiguation)
 Universal joint (Hooke's joint) 
 Hooke's law